Hilary Norris is a New Zealand stage, film and television actress.

Biography 
Norris has performed on stage and in film and television productions. She performed in theatre productions at Dunedin's Fortune Theatre from 1975 to 2013, and holds the record for the most appearances at the Fortune.

Norris serves as an adjudicator for theatre festivals across New Zealand.

Recognition 
Norris received a Lifetime Achievement Award at the 2013 Dunedin Theatre Awards.

Filmography

References 

Living people
21st-century New Zealand actresses
Year of birth missing (living people)